Georgiana Angela Maxwell, 26th Baroness de Ros of Helmsley (née Ross) (2 May 1933 – 21 April 1983) was a British peeress.

Biography
Lady de Ros was the elder daughter of Lieutenant-Commander the Hon Peter Ross RN (born 8 August 1906, killed in action 14 October 1940), elder son of Una Ross, 25th Baroness de Ros, and of the Hon Angela Ierne Evelyn Dixon (born 16 February 1907, died October 2003), a daughter of Herbert Dixon, 1st Baron Glentoran.

Lady de Ros studied at Wycombe Abbey and Studley Royal Agricultural College. She gained a National Diploma in Dairying.

She succeeded her grandmother the 25th baroness, who died in 1956, in the peerage when the barony was called out of abeyance in her favour in 1958. She was the first female holder of the barony to be allowed to sit in the House of Lords after the Peerage Act 1963.

Marriage and children
Lady de Ros married Commander John David Maxwell RN on 24 July 1954.  They had two children:

 The Hon Diana Elizabeth Maxwell (born 6 June 1957), married firstly on 29 November 1976 to Jonathan Watkins, without issue, secondly in 1978 to Don Richard Bell, without issue, and thirdly in 1987 to Eric Ford with whom she has one child:
 Nisha Altalia Maxwell Ford (born 1988)
 Peter Trevor Maxwell, 27th Baron de Ros (born 23 December 1958), the current holder of the title.

References

"de Ros, Baron (Maxwell) (Baron E 1264)." Debrett's Peerage & Baronetage 1995. London: Debrett's Peerage Limited, 1995. pp. 362–363.

27
Maxwell, Georgiana, Baroness de Ros
Maxwell, Georgiana, Baroness de Ros
De Ros, Georgiana Maxwell, 27th Baroness
20th-century British women politicians
20th-century English nobility